Delfina Elizabeth Guzmán Díaz (born 13 November 1960) is a Mexican politician affiliated with National Regeneration Movement.  Between 2012 and 2015, she was a federal deputy in the LXII Legislature of the Mexican Congress representing Oaxaca, at which time she was affiliated with the PRD.
In 2018, she won election as a local deputy to the Oaxaca state legislature, one of 24 Morena candidates (out of 25 districts) to win election.

References

1960 births
Living people
People from Oaxaca
Institutional Revolutionary Party politicians
21st-century Mexican politicians
Morena (political party) politicians
Members of the Chamber of Deputies (Mexico) for Oaxaca